Back in Business is the fifth studio album by the hip-hop duo EPMD, released on September 16, 1997, through Def Jam Recordings. It was their first album since 1992, when the pair had broken up due to money issues.  The single "Da Joint" became their second Billboard Hot 100 hit.

The album was certified Gold by the RIAA on November 17, 1997.

Critical reception
Vibe wrote that "Sermon's sluggish production makes the duo's paper-thin and finance-driven subject matter that much more irritating." Rolling Stone declared: "Gone is the Wall of Sound funk that made EPMD famous." The Austin American-Statesman thought that "jams such as 'Richter Scale' and 'Get With This' show true EPMD style as Erick and Parish sound perfect together over guitar funk." The Guardian wrote that Back in Business "returns to the breaks and beats that made [EPMD] great: kooky 1970s funk samples mixed with guitar loops and cool-as-ice vocals."

Track listing

Samples
Richter Scale
"Person to Person" by Average White Band
"Jungle Boogie" by Kool & the Gang
"California Love" by 2Pac
Da Joint
"Help Me Make It Through the Night" by Gladys Knight & the Pips
"Think (About It)" by Lyn Collins
"The New Style" by Beastie Boys
Never Seen Before
"Just Kissed My Baby" by The Meters
"Public Enemy No. 1" by Public Enemy
"It's Funky Enough" by The D.O.C.
Intrigued
"Walk on By" by Gloria Gaynor
Last Man Standing
"Midnight Groove" by Love Unlimited Orchestra
"Hell on Earth (Front Lines)" by Mobb Deep
"Change the Beat (Female Version)" by Beside
Get Wit This
"We Don't Care" by Manfred Hübler
"The Big Beat" by Billy Squier
"I Know You Got Soul" by Eric B. & Rakim
Do It Again
"Funkin' for Jamaica (N.Y.)" by Tom Browne
You Gots 2 Chill '97
"Jungle Boogie" by Kool & the Gang
"More Bounce to the Ounce" by Zapp
K.I.M. (Keep It Movin')
"Symphony No. 40 (Third Movement)" by Wolfgang Amadeus Mozart
"Girls" by Beastie Boys
"Da Mad Face Invasion" by Onyx
Jane 5
"Papa Was Too" by Joe Tex
"You Are What I'm All About" by The New Birth
"Mary Jane" by Rick James
Never Seen Before (Remix)
"Watching You" by Slave
"It's Funky Enough" by The D.O.C.

Charts

Weekly charts

Year-end charts

Singles

References

1997 albums
EPMD albums
Def Jam Recordings albums
Albums produced by DJ Scratch
Albums produced by Rockwilder
Albums produced by Agallah
Albums produced by Erick Sermon